The Série 0450 is a type of diesel multiple unit train used by the Portuguese Railways (CP). They were originally built in 1965-66 as the Série 0400. Following extensive modernisation and refurbishment in 1999 they were redesignated Série 0450; 19 units are in service.

They are used on numerous services, including the international service between Porto and Vigo.

References

Diesel multiple units of Portugal

External links 
 Page about CP 0450 on Trainlogistic